Au Kam-san (born 30 April 1957 in Macau with family roots in Xinxing, Guangdong, China) is a member of Legislative Assembly of Macau. He is a member of New Macau Association (quit in 2016). and is one of the three pro-democracy lawmakers in Macau.

Election results

See also
 List of members of the Legislative Assembly of Macau

References

1957 births
Living people
Cantonese people
Members of the Legislative Assembly of Macau
New Macau Association politicians
21st-century Macau people
21st-century Chinese politicians